This is a list of television programs previously broadcast by the Canadian television channel DejaView.

Current programming
This a list of programs currently being broadcast

A-E
 Cheers (2004; 2010-2013; 2022-present)
 Due South (2020–present)

F-M
 Face to Face with David (2021–present)
 Family Ties (2022–present)
 Frasier (2018-present)

N-T
 Ransom (2020-present)
 Spin City (2022-present)
 Three’s Company (2009-2018, 2020-present)

U-Z
 Zoe Busiek: Wild Card (2020–present)

Past

A-E
 The A-Team (2002-2006)
 Acting Crazy
 Adam-12 (2002-2004)
 Adventures in Rainbow Country (2003-2004)
 All in the Family (2006–2018)
 Archie Bunker's Place (2010–2012)
 Barney Miller (2002-2004)
 The Beverly Hillbillies (2004-2007)
 Boy Meets World (2018)
 Bewitched (2002-2004)
 Blossom (2018-2020)
 Bomb Girls (2014)
 Charles in Charge (2008)
 Coach (2009, 2010)
 The Cosby Show (2007)
 Danger Bay (2004)
 Designing Women (2010)
 The Dick Van Dyke Show (2004-2007)
 Dragnet (2002-2004)
 The Drew Carey Show (2010-2014)
  Dancing with the Stars (American TV series) (2019-2021)
 The King of Queens (2020-2021)

F-J
 The Facts of Life (2007-2010)
  Family Feud (2008-2021)
  Family Game Night (game show) (2016-2020)
 Fanatical
 Gilligan's Island (2002-2007)
 Good Times (2007)
 Green Acres (2005-2008)
 Happy Days (2002-2007)
 Haven (2014–2020)
 Hawaii Five-O (2010)
 Hee Haw (2004-2006)
 Hogan's Heroes (2002-2007)
 I Dream of Jeannie (2002-2004)
 The Incredible Hulk (2004)
 It Seems Like Yesterday (2003-2004)
 The Joke's on Us (2002-2004)
 JAG (TV series) (2012)

K-O
 Kate & Allie (2008-2011)
 Knight Rider (2004)
 Laverne and Shirley (2003-2006)
 Mad About You (2009)
 Magnum, P.I. (2007-2009)
 Major Dad (2012-2016) 
 Man with a Plan(2018-2020)
 Married... with Children (2013–2014)
 M*A*S*H (2006-2007)
 Maude (2007-2010)
 McHale's Navy (2002)
 Meet the Collectors (2005-2010)
 Miami Vice (2003-2005)
 My Secret Identity (ended in 2008)
 Neon Rider (2008)
 Night Heat (2007)
 North of 60 (2009)
 The Odd Couple (2016–2019)
 One Day at a Time (2009)

P-T
 Petticoat Junction (2002-2005)
 The Rifleman (2009)
 The Rockford Files (2002-2007; 2009)
 Rookie Blue (2014–2020)
 The Ropers (2007-2009-2010)
 Reba (2018)
 Remedy (2018–2020)
 Roseanne (2008–2016)
 The Saint (2002-2003)
 Saved By the Bell (2009-2012)
 Seeing Things (2007)
 Seinfeld (2010)
 Silver Spoons (2009-2012)
 Simon & Simon (2004)
 Sketches of Our Town (2004)
 Square Pegs (2007-2008)
 Suburgatory
 Super Dave Osborne Show (2002-2004)
 T. and T. (2002-2004)
 Taxi (2002-2003)
 The Golden Girls  (2009, 2010, 2017)
  The Office (American TV series) (2007-2019)
 Three's a Crowd (2007, 2008, 2010)
 TV with TV's Jonathan Torrens (2014–2015)

U-Z
 Welcome Back, Kotter (2003)
 Who's the Boss? (2007-2010)
 The Wonder Years (2007-2009)

Upcoming
  Touched By an Angel (2022)

DejaView